Cherlagudipadu is a village in Palnadu district of the Indian state of Andhra Pradesh. It is located in Gurazala mandal of Gurazala revenue division.

Geography 

Governance 

Cherlagudipadu gram panchayat is the local self-government of the village. It is divided into wards and each ward is represented by a ward member.

Education 

As per the school information report for the academic year 2018–19, the village has a total of 3 Zilla/Mandal Parishad schools.

References 

Villages in Palnadu district